Catherine Walsh or Katherine Walsh may refer to:

Catherine Walsh (poet) (born 1964), Irish poet
Catherine Walsh (athlete) (active since 1992), Irish Paralympian athlete
Catherine Walsh (actress), (born 1970), Irish actress
Katherine Walsh (politician) (elected 1988), former member of the Ohio House of Representatives
Katherine Walsh (actress) (1947–1970), American actress

See also
Kathy Walsh (disambiguation)
Kate Walsh (disambiguation)